Chester Road railway station is a railway station serving the Pype Hayes, Erdington, Wylde Green and Boldmere areas of north-east Birmingham, in the West Midlands county of England. It is situated on the Redditch/Bromsgrove-Birmingham New Street-Lichfield Cross-City Line.

It is a park and ride station, and has a free car park which was expanded in May 2006.

Pedestrian access to the station is via Green Lanes, near the junction with the Chester Road (A452). The station is above road level, as the line here is on an embankment.

History
The LNWR became part of the London Midland and Scottish Railway in 1921, as part of the Grouping, which was nationalised to become part of British Railways at the beginning of 1948. The station booking office and waiting room were rebuilt in 1991-1992 during the electrification of the line.

Service
The station is served by West Midlands Trains with local Transport for West Midlands branded "Cross-City" services, operated by Class 323 electrical multiple units. The station is served by four trains an hour in each direction on weekdays and Saturdays (every 30 minutes on Sundays), with an average journey time to Birmingham New Street of around 16 minutes.

Access for disabled passengers
There are ramps providing step-free access to both platforms at Chester Road.

Nearby
The station serves:
The Wylde Green shopping area

References

External links

Rail Around Birmingham and the West Midlands: Chester Road railway station
Warwickshire Railways page

Railway stations in Birmingham, West Midlands
DfT Category E stations
Former London and North Western Railway stations
Railway stations in Great Britain opened in 1863
Railway stations served by West Midlands Trains